Flat as a Pancake is the debut studio album by American rock band Head East. At first, the album was released independently on Pyramid Records. However, when radio stations began to play the song "Never Been Any Reason", A&M Records signed the band and re-released the album in June 1975.

It is Head East's only album to be certified Gold by the RIAA.

Head East recorded the album at Golden Voice Studios in South Pekin, Illinois.

The diner photographed on the back cover of the A&M reissue is the Rite-Way Diner, still in business (now as the Olivette Diner) at 9638 Olive Blvd, Olivette, Missouri.

Track listing
 "Never Been Any Reason" - 5:10 (Mike Somerville)
 "One Against the Other" - 3:47 (John Schlitt)
 "Love Me Tonight" - 4:27 (Mike Somerville)
 "City of Gold" - 3:41 (Steve Huston)
 "Fly By Night Lady" - 2:47 Steve Huston)
 "Jefftown Creek" - 6:41 (Steve Huston)
 "Lovin' Me Along" - 5:25 (Mike Somerville)
 "Ticket Back to Georgia" - 4:02 (Steve Huston)
 "Brother Jacob" - 3:10 (Steve Huston)

Chart performance
The album went to #126 on Billboard's Pop Album Chart, and was certified Gold by the RIAA on September 19, 1978, selling over 500,000 copies.

Album

Singles

Personnel
 Roger Boyd - keyboards/vocals
 Steve Huston - drums/vocals
 Mike Somerville - guitar/vocals
 Dan Birney - bass
 John Schlitt - lead vocals

References

1974 debut albums
Head East albums
A&M Records albums